Lenhardt Airpark  is a privately owned, public use airport located 3 miles (4.8 km) east of Hubbard in Clackamas County, Oregon, United States.

External links

Airports in Marion County, Oregon